Alcantarea benzingii is a species in the genus Alcantarea. This species is endemic to Brazil.

References

benzingii
Flora of Brazil